Margown County is in Kohgiluyeh and Boyer-Ahmad province, Iran. The capital of the county is the city of Margown. At the 2006 census, the county's population (as Margown District of Boyer-Ahmad County) was 23,019 in 4,431 households. The following census in 2011 counted 20,937 people in 4,735 households. At the 2016 census, the district's population was 19,876 in 4,923 households. It was separated from Boyer-Ahmad County in 2019 to become Margown County.

Administrative divisions

The population history of Margown County's administrative divisions over three consecutive censuses is shown in the following table.

References

 

Counties of Kohgiluyeh and Boyer-Ahmad Province